This was the first edition of the tournament.

Nikola Čačić and Denys Molchanov won the title after defeating Marcelo Arévalo and Jonny O'Mara 7–6(7–3), 6–4 in the final.

Seeds

Draw

References

External links
 Main draw

Bendigo Challenger - Doubles